Kelly Russell (born December 7, 1986) was a Canadian rugby union player, and is a coach for the sport. She captained  at the 2014 Women's Rugby World Cup and was named to the Dream Team.

International career 
Russell has also featured in two Rugby World Cup Sevens in 2009 and 2013.

Kelly and her younger sister Laura were both named in the 2014 World Cup squad.

She won a gold medal at the 2015 Pan American Games as a member of the Canadian women's rugby sevens team.

In 2016, Russell was named to Canada's first ever women's rugby sevens Olympic team. The team won bronze.

References

External links
 Rugby Canada Player Profile 
 

1986 births
Living people
Canadian female rugby union players
Rugby sevens players at the 2015 Pan American Games
Pan American Games gold medalists for Canada
Rugby sevens players at the 2016 Summer Olympics
Olympic rugby sevens players of Canada
Canada international rugby sevens players
Canada women's international rugby union players
Female rugby sevens players
Olympic bronze medalists for Canada
Olympic medalists in rugby sevens
Medalists at the 2016 Summer Olympics
Pan American Games medalists in rugby sevens
Medalists at the 2015 Pan American Games
Canada international women's rugby sevens players